Behruziyeh (also Romanized as Behrūzīyeh) is a village in Azadegan Rural District, in the Central District of Rafsanjan County, Kerman Province, Iran. At the 2006 census, its population was 27, in 7 families.

References 

Populated places in Rafsanjan County